The White Sister (Spanish:La hermana blanca) is a 1960 Mexican drama film directed by Tito Davison and starring Jorge Mistral, Yolanda Varela and  Prudencia Grifell.

Cast
 Jorge Mistral as Juan Escandón  
 Yolanda Varela  as Ángela  
 Prudencia Grifell as Madame Bernard  
 Andrea Palma as Madre superiora 
 Augusto Benedico as Monseñor  
 Manuel Arvide as General 
 Alejandra Meyer as Lupe, sirvienta 
 Aurora Walker as Tía de Ángela

References

Bibliography 
 Emilio García Riera. Historia documental del cine mexicano: 1959-1960. Universidad de Guadalajara, 1994.

External links 
 

1960 films
1960 drama films
Mexican drama films
1960s Spanish-language films
Films based on American novels
Films based on works by Francis Marion Crawford
Films directed by Tito Davison
Remakes of American films
1960s Mexican films